Teresita Santos is a politician from the Northern Mariana Islands. Formerly a member of the Northern Mariana Islands House of Representatives, she currently serves as a member of the Northern Mariana Islands Senate.

Santos, a resident of the island of Rota, is a member of the Republican Party, and represents the 1st Senatorial District. Currently she serves as Legislative Secretary of the Senate. She currently chairs the committee on Health and Welfare; she is the vice-chair of the committees on Education and Youth Affairs, Fiscal Affairs, and Judiciary, Government, and Law, and is a member of the committees on Rules and Procedure and Executive Appointments and Government Investigations. She has spoken of the need to invest more money in the Commonwealth Healthcare Corporation to improve its hospital services. As of 2017 she was the only woman sitting in the Senate. Santos served in the House of Representatives alongside Felicidad Ogumoro and Janet Maratita; when the latter was sworn in for a new term in 2011 the three became the first three women to serve together in the House in the history of the Northern Mariana Islands. At the time she was an independent. Her cousin is the former director of the Department of Public Safety on Rota, Felix M. Santos, who challenged her for her seat in the House in 2012.

References

Living people
Northern Mariana Islands women in politics
Members of the Northern Mariana Islands House of Representatives
Northern Mariana Islands Senators
Republican Party (Northern Mariana Islands) politicians
People from Rota (island)
Year of birth missing (living people)
21st-century American women